Joaquín Luis Romero Marchent (26 August 1921 – 16 August 2012) was a Spanish screenwriter and film director. He directed several Spaghetti Westerns during the 1960s.

He died on 16 August 2012 at the age of 91 in Madrid.

Filmography

References

Bibliography 
 de España, Rafael. Directory of Spanish and Portuguese film-makers and films. Greenwood Press, 1994.

External links 
 

1921 births
2012 deaths
Spanish film directors
Spanish screenwriters
People from Madrid